There are at least 20 species of Gymnosperms or Coniferous plants in Montana.

The conifers, division Pinophyta, also known as division Coniferophyta or Coniferae, are one of 13 or 14 division level taxa within the Kingdom Plantae. Pinophytes are gymnosperms. They are cone-bearing seed plants with vascular tissue; all extant conifers are woody plants, the great majority being trees with just a few being shrubs. Typical examples of conifers include cedars, Douglas firs, cypresses, firs, junipers, kauris, larches, pines, hemlocks, redwoods, spruces, and yews. The division contains approximately eight families, 68 genera, and 630 living species.

The Ponderosa pine, a conifer, is the Montana State Tree.

Cedars and junipers
Order: Pinales, Family: Cupressaceae
 Common juniper, Juniperus communis
 Creeping juniper, Juniperus horizontalis
 Rocky mountain juniper, Juniperus scopulorum
 Utah juniper, Juniperus osteosperma
 Western redcedar, Thuja plicata

Fir, hemlock, larch, pine, and spruce

Order: Pinales, Family: Pinaceae
 Alpine larch, Larix lyallii
 Douglas fir, Pseudotsuga menziesii
 Engelmann spruce, Picea engelmannii
 Grand fir, Abies grandis
 Limber pine, Pinus flexilis
 Lodgepole pine, Pinus contorta
 Mountain hemlock, Tsuga mertensiana
 Ponderosa pine, Pinus ponderosa
 Subalpine fir, Abies lasiocarpa
 Western hemlock, Tsuga heterophylla
 Western larch, Larix occidentalis
 Western white pine, Pinus monticola
 White spruce, Picea glauca
 Whitebark pine, Pinus albicaulis

Yew
Order: Pinales, Family: Taxaceae
 Pacific yew, Taxus brevifolia

Further reading

See also
 Ecology of the Rocky Mountains
 Lichens of Montana
 Monocotyledons of Montana

Notes

.Coniferous plants
Montana
Montana
Conifer